Bir Bahadur Rana is a Nepali politician of Nepali Congress and Minister for Energy, Water Resource and Irrigation since 10 October 2021. He is also serving as member of the Provincial Assembly of Lumbini Province. Sharma, a resident of Palpa, was elected to the 2017 provincial assembly elections from proportional list of the party.

References

Living people
Nepali Congress politicians from Lumbini Province
Year of birth missing (living people)
Provincial cabinet ministers of Nepal
Members of the Provincial Assembly of Lumbini Province